Events in the year 1982 in Brazil.

Incumbents

Federal government
 President: General João Figueiredo
 Vice President: Aureliano Chaves

Governors 
 Acre: vacant
 Alagoas: Guilherme Palmeira (until 15 March); Teobaldo Vasconcelos (from 15 March)
 Amazonas: José Bernardino Lindoso (until 15 May); Paul Pinto Nery (from 15 May)
 Bahia: Antônio Carlos Magalhães 
 Ceará: Virgílio Távora (until 15 March); Manuel de Castro (from 15 March)
 Espírito Santo: Eurico Vieira Resende 
 Goiás: Ary Valadão 
 Maranhão: João Castelo (until 15 May); Ivar Saldanha (from 14 May) 
 Mato Grosso: Frederico Campos 
 Mato Grosso do Sul: Pedro Pedrossian 
 Minas Gerais: Francelino Pereira 
 Pará: Alacid Nunes 
 Paraíba: Tarcísio Burity (until 14 May); Clóvis Cavalcanti (from 14 May)	 
 Paraná: Nei Braga then José Hosken de Novais 
 Pernambuco: Marco Maciel (until 15 May); José Muniz Ramos (from 15 May) 
 Piauí: Lucídio Portela 
 Rio de Janeiro: Antônio Chagas Freitas
 Rio Grande do Norte: Lavoisier Maia 
 Rio Grande do Sul: José Augusto Amaral de Souza 
 Rondônia: Jorge Teixeira de Oliveira (from 4 January)
 Santa Catarina: Jorge Bornhausen (until 14 May); Henrique Córdova (from 14 May)	 
 São Paulo: Paulo Maluf (until 14 May); José Maria Marin (from 14 May)
 Sergipe: Augusto Franco (until 14 May); Djenal Queirós (from 14 May)

Vice governors
 Acre: José Fernandes Rego
 Alagoas: Teobaldo Vasconcelos Barbosa 
 Amazonas: Paulo Pinto Nery (until 14 May); vacant thereafter (from 14 May)
 Bahia: Luis Viana Neto 
 Ceará: Manuel de Castro Filho (until 14 May); vacant thereafter (from 14 May)
 Espírito Santo: José Carlos Fonseca 
 Goiás: Rui Brasil Cavalcanti 
 Maranhão: Artur Teixeira de Carvalho (until 29 January); vacant thereafter (from 14 May)
 Mato Grosso: José Vilanova Torres 
 Mato Grosso do Sul: vacant
 Minas Gerais: João Marques de Vasconcelos 
 Pará: Gerson dos Santos Peres 
 Paraíba: Clóvis Cavalcanti (until 14 May); vacant thereafter (from 14 May)
 Paraná: José Hosken de Novaes (until 14 May); vacant thereafter (from 14 May)
 Pernambuco: Roberto Magalhães Melo (until 14 May); vacant thereafter (from 14 May)
 Piauí: Waldemar de Castro Macedo
 Rio de Janeiro: Hamilton Xavier
 Rio Grande do Norte: Geraldo Melo 
 Rio Grande do Sul: Otávio Badui Germano 
 Santa Catarina: Henrique Hélion Velho de Córdova (until 14 May); vacant thereafter (from 14 May)
 São Paulo: José Maria Marin (until 14 May); vacant thereafter (from 14 May)
 Sergipe: Djenal Tavares Queiroz (until 14 May); vacant thereafter (from 14 May)

Events

January
 January 4 - Rondônia, Brazil's 23rd state, is established.

Births 
July 12 – Vinicius Machado, producer and actor 
July 19 – Raphael Assunção, mixed martial artist
August 29 – Mayana Moura, actress and former model

Deaths

References

See also 
1982 in Brazilian football
1982 in Brazilian television
List of Brazilian films of 1982

 
1980s in Brazil
Years of the 20th century in Brazil
Brazil
Brazil